Dichomeris porphyrogramma is a moth in the family Gelechiidae. It was described by Edward Meyrick in 1914. It is found in Guyana, Peru, and Pará, Brazil.

The forewings are pale ochreous, suffused with bright deep ferruginous or ferruginous brown. All veins and the costa are marked with purple-blue or violet-grey streaks. The hindwings are dark grey, lighter anteriorly.

References

porphyrogramma
Moths of South America
Moths described in 1914
Taxa named by Edward Meyrick